The 2021–22 LEB Plata season was the 22nd season of the Spanish basketball third league. It started on 9 October 2021 with the first round of the regular season and ended on 21 May 2022 with the promotion playoffs.

Teams

Promotion and relegation (pre-season)
A total of 28 teams contested the league, including 20 sides from the 2020–21 season, three relegated from the 2020–21 LEB Oro and five promoted from the 2020–21 Liga EBA.

Teams relegated from LEB Oro
Hereda Club Ourense Baloncesto
ICG Força Lleida (swapped places with Barça B)
Tizona Universidad de Burgos
Real Canoe NC

Teams promoted from Liga EBA
CB Fuenlabrada B
Safir Fruits Alginet
Valencia Basket B
FC Cartagena CB
Movistar Estudiantes B
Recambios Gaudí CB Mollet
Sant Antoni Ibiza Feeling

Teams that avoided relegation to Liga EBA
Ibersol CB Tarragona
Hozono Global Jairis
CB Cornellà (swapped places with Barça B)
NCS Alcobendas
CB Morón
Torrons Vicens CB L'Hospitalet

Venues and locations

Regular season

Group East

Group West

Playoffs

Group champions' playoffs

|}
Source: FEB

Promotion playoffs

Round of 16

|}
Source: FEB

Quarter-finals

|}
Source: FEB

Semi-finals

|}
Source: FEB

Relegation playoffs

|}
Source: FEB

Copa LEB Plata
The Copa LEB Plata was played by the top team of each group after the end of the first half of the season (round 13). The cup was scheduled originally on 29 January 2022 and was postponed to 12 March 2022 in response to the COVID-19 pandemic.

Teams qualified

Game

Final standings

References

External links
 Official website 

LEB2
LEB Plata seasons